A summary of the year 2003 in the Irish music industry.

Summary 
 On July 16, R.E.M. played to a crowd of 16,000 at Marlay Park in Dublin, arriving on stage at 9 p.m. They were supported by Orager and Starsailor.
 On December 7–8, Blur played the Olympia Theatre, Dublin, in their last Irish shows before they went on hiatus until their return to the country to headline Oxegen 2009.

Bands formed 
 The Blizzards
 Boss Volenti
 The Coronas
 Hal
 The Marshals
 Royseven (then known as Jove)

Bands disbanded 
 The Cranberries (hiatus)
 Skindive

Bands reformed 
 The Stunning

Albums & EPs 
Below is a list of notable albums & EPs released by Irish artists in Ireland in 2003.

 So Much for the City – The Thrills (May 27, 2003)
 Forward – Turn (May 30, 2003)'
 Music in Mouth – Bell X1 (July 18, 2003)
 Square One – David Kitt (September 2003) 
 Get What You Need – The Undertones (September 30, 2003)
 Living – Paddy Casey (October 17, 2003)
Unknown
 My Sanctuary – Autamata (2003) 
 Live from the Union Chapel – Damien Rice (2003)
 Hotel Room EP – Fionn Regan (2003) (EP)
 Set List – The Frames (2003) (Live album)
 The Roads Outgrown – The Frames (2003) (EP)

Singles 
Below is a list of notable singles released by Irish artists in Ireland in 2003.

Date unknown
 "Spitting Games" – Snow Patrol (2003)
 "One Horse Town" – The Thrills (2003)
 "Big Sur" – The Thrills (2003)
 "Santa Cruz (You're Not That Far)" – The Thrills (2003)
 "Don't Steal Our Sun" – The Thrills (2003)

Festivals

Witnness 2003 
 Witnness 2003 was the fourth and final Witnness festival to take place. It took place in a new venue, Punchestown Racecourse in County Kildare on Saturday July 12 and Sunday July 13. Acts to appear included Coldplay, Damien Rice, The Frames, The Cardigans, The Walls, The Streets, David Gray, Manic Street Preachers, Super Furry Animals, The Polyphonic Spree, Röyksopp, The Coral, Gemma Hayes, Mogwai, The Thrills, The Rapture, OK Go, Turn, Berkeley, Fionn Regan, Paddy Casey, Snow Patrol and Bell X1. The White Stripes scheduled appearance was cancelled due to frontman Jack White suffering a broken hand. The Flaming Lips were stepped up the bill to replace The White Stripes and delivered a well-received set which included a version of White Stripes' single "Seven Nation Army".

Heineken Green Energy 
 Heineken Green Energy took place for the 8th year in 2003. It was held in Dublin over the May Bank Holiday weekend. 2003's venues included Dublin Castle, the Ambassador, Temple Bar Music Centre, The Village and Whelans as well as 20 other key music venues in Dublin City. Over the weekend approximately 40,000 people attended in excess of 17 live gigs. Musicians to play the 2003 festival included Groove Armada, Moloko, Craig David, Stereophonics and Beck.

Slane 2003 
 Slane 2003 took place on Saturday August 23 and was headlined by Red Hot Chili Peppers. Support came from Foo Fighters, Queens of the Stone Age, PJ Harvey, Feeder, Morcheeba and Halite. Tickets sold out 2 and a half hours after going on sale.

Music awards

2003 Meteor Awards 
The 2003 Meteor Awards were hosted by comedian Dara Ó Briain on February ?, 2003. Below are the winners:

References

External links 
 IMRO website
 IRMA website
 Hot Press website
 State website
 MUSE.ie
 CLUAS.com
 News at Phantom FM
 Music at The Irish Times
 Music at the Irish Independent
 Music news and album reviews at RTÉ